Joaquim Lobo da Silveira, 7th Count of Oriola (1772–1846) was a Portuguese plenipotentiary at the Congress of Vienna in 1815. While at the Congress he signed a number of treaties and documents on behalf of Prince-Regent John of Portugal including the Declaration of the Powers, on the Abolition of the Slave Trade, on 8 February 1815.

Later he acquired land in Prussia and settled there becoming a naturalised citizen of Prussia.
The King of Prussia granted him the title of graf (the German equivalent to his Portuguese title of conde (count)).

Notes

References

Further reading
 "His Portuguese grandfather, Joaquin Jose Lobo da Silveira (1772 – 1846)... [whose] son was Eduardo Ernesto Lobo da Silveira, Graf von Oriola (1809 – 1862) [de]"

1772 births
1846 deaths
18th-century Portuguese people
19th-century Portuguese people
Portuguese diplomats
S